Fire in the Opera House is a 1930 German drama film directed by Carl Froelich and starring Alexa Engström, Gustav Fröhlich and Gustaf Gründgens. A separate French-language version La barcarolle d'amour was also produced.

It was shot at the Babelsberg Studios in Berlin. The film's sets were designed by Franz Schroedter.

Cast
 Alexa Engström as Floriane Bach
 Gustav Fröhlich as Richard Faber
 Gustaf Gründgens as Otto van Lingen
 Gertrud Arnold as Frau Konsul van Lingen
 Marianne Fröhlich as Ilse van Lingen
 Hans Peppler as Der Theaterdirektor
 Julius Falkenstein as Löwenthal, Kassierer
 Arthur Kistenmacher as Der alte Korrepetitor
 Paul Mederow as Munk, erster Kapellmeister
 Aenne Goerling as Anna Riehl, Sängerin
 Ilse Nast as Berta Kranz, Choristin
 Hadrian Maria Netto
 Sophie Pagay
 Erich Kober
 Bruno Hoenscherle
 Art Winkler
 Arthur Bergen
 Marcel Merminod
 Franz Verdier
 Adolf Schroeder
 Willy Kaiser-Heyl
 Jarmila Novotná as Die Primadonna
 Irmgard Groß as Nikolaus
 Hendrik Appels as Titelpartie in 'Tannhäuser'
 Paul Rehkopf as Landgraf in 'Tannhäuser'
 Gerhard Vöge as Wolfram von Eschenbach in 'Tannhäuser'
 Werner Engels as Biterolf in 'Tannhäuser'
 Chor der Staatsoper Berlin as Chor

References

Bibliography

External links 
 

1930 films
1930 drama films
Films of the Weimar Republic
German drama films
German disaster films
1930s German-language films
Films directed by Carl Froelich
Films about opera
German multilingual films
German black-and-white films
1930 multilingual films
Films shot at Babelsberg Studios
1930s German films